Macraes, formerly known as Macraes Flat, and known in Māori as Ōtī, is a town in the Waitaki District in Otago, New Zealand. It is known as a mining town, with a long history of gold extraction. The town sits 55 km north of Dunedin in New Zealand's South Island.

The Macraes Mine, New Zealand's largest gold mine, is nearby.

The settlement was named after John McRae, who lived in the area in the late 1850s before gold was discovered nearby. In 2015 the name of the town was officially altered from Macraes Flat to Macraes.

References 

Waitaki District
Populated places in Otago
Mining communities in New Zealand